CEDRAC is the abbreviated name of the research and documentation center for Arabic Christianity of the Saint Joseph University in Beirut, Lebanon.  It was established in 1986 by Fr. Samir Khalil Samir.  It was incorporated in 1996 into the Université Saint-Joseph.

The CEDRAC sees itself as following in the tradition of the researchers Louis Cheikhô and Georg Graf who worked in this discipline in Beirut at the end of the 19th and start of the twentieth century.

The center holds some 23,000 books and multimedia items. The disciplines studied are history, philosophy, philology, and religion: Christianity, Islam and other religions of the region with a focus on Lebanon, Syria, Iraq, Palestine, and Egypt. The literature is in several languages and comprises documents about these religions from their origin to the present day. Moreover, it organises seminars and conferences and prepares and publishes various publications.

External links 
Official Website

1986 establishments in Lebanon
Organizations established in 1986
Religious organisations based in Lebanon
Saint Joseph University
Christian and Islamic interfaith dialogue